In military terms, 65th Division may refer to:

 Infantry Divisions
 65th Infantry Division (Russian Empire)
 65th Infantry Division (United States)
 65th Infantry Division (Wehrmacht)
 65th Infantry Division Granatieri di Savoia of the Italian Army in the Second World War
 65th Division (Imperial Japanese Army)
 65th (2nd Lowland) Division of the British Army in the First World War
 65th Infantry Division (United States)
 65th Infantry Division (Wehrmacht)

 Cavalry Divisions
65th Cavalry Division (United States)

 Aviation Divisions
 65th Air Division (United States)

See also
 65th Regiment (disambiguation)
 65th Squadron (disambiguation)